Patrick Francis Joyce (31 May 1923 — 27 July 2000) was an actor in film and television.

Biography
Joyce was born in Trieste, Italy. His father was Frantisek Schaurek, a Czech banker who had stolen money from the Živnostenská Bank in Trieste where he worked and committed suicide in 1926. His mother was Eileen Schaurek (nee Joyce), the sister of the author James Joyce. After his father's death, his mother returned to Ireland with Joyce and his two elder sisters, Nora and Bozena.

 
 
Joyce appeared in nearly 90 film and television productions, and played Tommy Deakin on the British soap opera Coronation Street (1968–74). In his later years he also played John Royle in another long-running British soap opera, EastEnders (1990–91, 1993).

His other credits date back to the 1950s, his screen debut being in the 1953 film The Cruel Sea, although his role in the film was unaccredited. Throughout the 1950s he appeared in films including The Girl in the Picture, The Steel Bayonet, Dublin Nightmare and Cover Girl Killer. In the 1960s his television roles began to become more and more frequent with appearances in shows including The Adventures of Robin Hood, No Hiding Place and The Revenue Men.

After he had completed his role in Coronation Street, Joyce had become widely recognised within the United Kingdom. In 1973, he appeared in two episodes of Crown Court and the film version of Never Mind the Quality Feel the Width; and between 1964 and 1976 he appeared in many different roles in the police procedural drama Z-Cars. In 1980 he appeared in an episode of The Enigma Files (The Fit Up).

In the 1980s he appeared in television shows including Minder, Auf Wiedersehen, Pet and The Bill, before being landed in the role of John Royle on EastEnders. His final credited performance was in the 1999 film Alice in Wonderland.

Joyce died of a stroke in London on 27 July 2000, aged 77 years.

References

External links 
 

1923 births
2000 deaths
20th-century Irish male actors
Irish expatriates in England
Irish male film actors
Irish male television actors
Irish male soap opera actors
Irish people of Czech descent
Italian emigrants to Ireland